653 Berenike is a main-belt asteroid discovered on 27 November 1907 by Joel Hastings Metcalf at Taunton, Massachusetts. It is named after Berenice II of Egypt, after whom the constellation Coma Berenices is also named. The name may have been inspired by the asteroid's provisional designation 1907 BK.

Berenike is a member of the dynamic Eos family of asteroids that most likely formed as the result of a collisional breakup of a parent body.

References

External links
 
 

Eos asteroids
Berenike
Berenike
S-type asteroids (Tholen)
K-type asteroids (SMASS)
19071127